Pyrgulina jullieni is a species of sea snail, a marine gastropod mollusk in the family Pyramidellidae, the pyrams and their allies.

References

 Dautzenberg P. (1912) Mission Gruvel sur la côte occidentale d'Afrique (1909-1910): Mollusques marins. Annales de l'Institut Océanographique, Paris, (Nouvelle Série) 5(3): 1-111, pl. 1-3.

External links
 To World Register of Marine Species

Pyramidellidae
Gastropods described in 1912